Hull Bay is a beach on the island Saint Thomas, United States Virgin Islands, located in the Caribbean.

Hull Bay is a quiet beach on the Northside of Saint Thomas, located west of Magens Bay. It is frequented by locals and dogs. Many small fishing boats are anchored at the beach. Although usually calm, on rough days, Hull Bay is a popular surfing beach.  The beach has a bar and restaurant, bathrooms, and a dive center.

Gallery

References

External links

Hull Bay Hideaway

Beaches of the United States Virgin Islands
Landforms of Saint Thomas, U.S. Virgin Islands